Restless is the fourth studio album by American country music singer Sara Evans. It was released in August 2003 via RCA Records Nashville. It has been certified platinum by the RIAA.

The album's first single, "Backseat of a Greyhound Bus", reached number 16 on the US Billboard Hot Country Songs chart. Despite the rather low chart performance of the first single, the album debuted at number 3 on the Billboard Top Country Albums chart and at number 20 on the Billboard 200 chart after selling 44,283 copies in its first week. The album's second single, "Perfect", fared better and reached number 2. "Suds in the Bucket", the third single, became a signature song for Evans, having reached number one on the country charts, making Restless her third consecutive album to contain a number one single. The fourth single, "Tonight", charted just outside the country Top 40 at number 41.

Track listing

Personnel 

 Sara Evans – lead vocals, backing vocals 
 John Hobbs – keyboards, Hammond B3 organ
 Steve Nathan – keyboards, acoustic piano
 Tim Lauer – accordion
 Marcus Hummon – acoustic guitar, baritone mandolin
 Darrell Scott – acoustic guitar, bouzouki, dobro, mandolin
 Biff Watson – acoustic guitar
 Paul Worley – acoustic guitar, electric guitars
 J.T. Corenflos – electric guitars
 Troy Lancaster – electric guitars
 Jerry McPherson – electric guitars
 Bryan Sutton – banjo, mandolin
 Gary Morse – dobro, steel guitar
 Michael Rhodes – bass
 Glenn Worf – bass 
 Matt Chamberlain – drums 
 David Huff – drum programming, percussion, shakers
 Eric Darken – drum programming, percussion
 Glen Caruba – percussion
 Tom Roady – percussion
 Aubrey Haynie – fiddle
 Peter Kevin Fisher – harmonica
 Jim Horn – saxophones, horn arrangements 
 Sam Levine – saxophones
 Barry Green – trombone
 Mike Haynes – trumpet
 John Mock – concertina, penny whistle
 Jonathan Yudkin – cello, Celtic harp
 Chris McDonald – string arrangements and conductor
 The Nashville String Machine – strings
 Bob Bailey – backing vocals
 Ashley Evans Simpson – backing vocals 
 Lesley Evans Lyons – backing vocals 
 Kim Fleming – backing vocals
 Vince Gill – backing vocals
 Adie Grey – backing vocals
 Vicki Hampton – backing vocals
 Wes Hightower – backing vocals
 Troy Johnson – backing vocals
 Hillary Lindsey – backing vocals 
 Ashlie Tucker – backing vocals

Production 
 Sara Evans – producer 
 Paul Worley – producer 
 Clarke Schleicher – recording, mixing 
 Mike Poole – additional engineer
 Erik Hellerman – additional engineer, recording assistant, digital editing 
 Wade Hachler – recording assistant 
 Rich Hanson – mix assistant 
 John Mayfield – mastering 
 Paige Connors – production coordinator 
 Bobby Garbedian – art direction
 Astrid Herbold May – art direction, design 
 Jeff Lipsky – photography 
 Bjorn – photography
 Ruby Weiser – hair stylist 
 Vanessa Scali – make-up
 Claudia Fowler – wardrobe stylist 
 Modern Management – management 

Studios
 Recorded at The Money Pit (Nashville, Tennessee).
 Additional recordings at Loud Recording and Paragon Studios (Nashville, Tennessee).
 Mixed at Loud Recording
 Mastered at Mayfield Mastering (Nashville, Tennessee).

Chart performance

Weekly charts

Year-end charts

Singles

Certifications

References

2003 albums
Sara Evans albums
RCA Records albums
Albums produced by Paul Worley